Pierre Ouellet (born September 2, 1950) is a Québecois writer, critic, and literature professor. He won the Governor General's Literary Award for French non-fiction in 2006 and 2008.

In 2015, he was awarded the Government of Quebec's Prix Athanase-David. In 2004, he was made a Fellow of the Royal Society of Canada.

References

External links
 https://web.archive.org/web/20160303180221/http://www.esthetiqueetpoetique.uqam.ca/titulaire.htm

1950 births
Living people
Fellows of the Royal Society of Canada
Writers from Quebec
Governor General's Award-winning non-fiction writers
Canadian male poets
Canadian male novelists
Canadian poets in French
Canadian novelists in French
20th-century Canadian poets
20th-century Canadian novelists
21st-century Canadian poets
21st-century Canadian novelists
20th-century Canadian male writers
21st-century Canadian male writers
Canadian male non-fiction writers